The Incheon Korean Music Wave is an annual music festival held at the Incheon Munhak Stadium in Incheon, South Korea and broadcast on MBC. The event is organized by HH Company and features South Korea's top artists.

History 
The first festival was held at the Incheon Munhak Stadium on September 5, 2009. The event was organized to commemorate the Visit Incheon 2009 campaign and was also part of the Global Fair & Festival Incheon 2009 event calendar. The concert was originally scheduled to take place on August 22, but due to the death of former South Korean president, Kim Dae-jung, it was moved to September 5.

Festivals

2009
Date: September 5, 2009
Hosts: Tiffany and Yuri of Girls' Generation, Oh Sang-jin
Performers: Girls' Generation, Kara, Shinee, Super Junior, Rain, M, 2PM, F.T. Island, Brown Eyed Girls, Jewelry, Baek Jiyoung, Younha, Lee Jung-hyun, Chae Yeon

2010
Date: August 29, 2010
Hosts: Tiffany and Yuri of Girls' Generation, Oh Sang-jin
Performers: BoA, SE7EN, Super Junior, Taeyang, 2PM, Girls' Generation, Kara, Son Dambi, SHINee, Brown Eyed Girls, SG Wannabe, F.T. Island, After School, CNBLUE, Supernova, U-KISS, 4Minute, BEAST, MBLAQ, SECRET

2011
Date: August 13, 2011
Hosts: Tiffany and Yuri of Girls' Generation, Oh Sang-jin
Performers: Super Junior, Girls' Generation, 2PM, 2NE1, BEAST, Kara, SHINee, 2AM, f(x), miss A, T-ara, MBLAQ, F.T. Island, 4Minute, SECRET, SISTAR, Infinite, Teen Top, ZE:A

2012
The event was cancelled due to expenses. HH Company, the event's organizer, posted an apology on the event's official website and issued refunds.

2013
Date: September 1, 2013
Hosts: Tiffany and Yuri of Girls' Generation
Performers: Super Junior, Girls' Generation, BEAST, SISTAR, Kara, MBLAQ, miss A, Teen Top, 2AM, ZE:A, SECRET, EXO, B.A.P, Rainbow, Boyfriend, T-ara, BTOB, A-JAX, BTS, Girl's Day, F.T. Island

See also

List of music festivals in South Korea
List of pop festivals

References

   

Incheon
Music festivals established in 2009
Pop music festivals
Music festivals in South Korea
Rock festivals in South Korea
K-pop festivals
Annual events in South Korea